The 1964 United States Senate election in Florida was held on November 3, 1964. Incumbent Democratic U.S. Senator Spessard Holland was re-elected to a fourth term in office, defeating J. Brailey Oldham in the primary and Republican Claude R. Kirk Jr. in the general election.

Democratic primary

Candidates 
Spessard Holland, incumbent U.S. Senator
J. Brailey Oldham, former State Representative and candidate for Governor in 1952 and 1954

Results

General election

Major candidates 
Spessard Holland (D), State Senator
Claude R. Kirk Jr. (R), Florida campaign manager for Richard Nixon in 1960

Results

See also  
 1964 United States Senate elections

References

Footnotes  

1964
Florida
United States Senate